Eller-Hosford House, also known as the Donald W. Crawford Residence, is a historic home located at Mishawaka, St. Joseph County, Indiana.  It was built about 1875, and is a two-story, Italianate style frame dwelling with a one-story wing.  It sits on a stone foundation, is sheathed in clapboard siding, and has a flat roof.  It features large segmental arched windows, a full-width front porch with four columns decorated with lattice work, and cornice with paired large brackets.  The house was renovated in 1979–1980.

It was listed on the National Register of Historic Places in 1983.

References

Houses on the National Register of Historic Places in Indiana
Italianate architecture in Indiana
Houses completed in 1875
Houses in St. Joseph County, Indiana
National Register of Historic Places in St. Joseph County, Indiana